Megachile badia is a species of bee in the family Megachilidae. It was described by Charles Thomas Bingham in 1890.

References

Badia
Insects described in 1890